Kiepersol Pass is situated in the Mpumalanga province, off the R536 road between Sabie and Hazyview (South Africa). Many banana farms can be seen on this road and pass.

References 

Mountain passes of Mpumalanga